Tracy Byrd is an American country music artist. His discography comprises ten studio albums, six compilation albums and thirty-four singles. Of his albums, three are certified gold by the RIAA (1993's Tracy Byrd, 1995's Love Lessons, 1996's Big Love and 1999's Keepers: Greatest Hits), with his highest-certified album being the double-platinum No Ordinary Man from 1994. Of his singles, two have topped the Billboard country singles charts: "Holdin' Heaven" in 1993 and "Ten Rounds with Jose Cuervo" in 2002. One of Byrd's songs topped the Canadian RPM Country tracks, "I'm from the Country" in 1998.

Studio albums

1990s

2000s–2010s

Compilation albums

Singles

1992-2000

2001-2007

Other singles

Christmas singles

Guest singles

Music videos

Notes

References

Byrd, Tracy discography
Discographies of American artists